The Wilderness is a forested region of Virginia that covers some of Orange County and Spotsylvania County, Virginia. Chancellorsville, Virginia is located here.

The Battle of the Wilderness was fought here in 1864.

See also

Forests of Virginia
Geography of Orange County, Virginia
Geography of Spotsylvania County, Virginia